Edward Gunston (7 May 1913 – 28 February 1991) was an Australian cricketer. He played three first-class cricket matches for Victoria in 1934.

See also
 List of Victoria first-class cricketers

References

External links
 

1913 births
1991 deaths
Australian cricketers
Victoria cricketers
Cricketers from Melbourne